James A. Murphy (March 31, 1889 Laurium, Michigan – March 19, 1939) of Detroit was a member of the Michigan Senate (1933–1939).

External links
Political Graveyard

1889 births
1939 deaths
People from Laurium, Michigan
Politicians from Detroit
Democratic Party Michigan state senators
Road incident deaths in the United States
20th-century American politicians